Posterior tibial tendon dysfunction is the dysfunction of the posterior tibial tendon. It is a progressive disease that has 4 stages and is the most common cause of adult flatfoot.

Causes 
Agreed-upon risk factors include: obesity; hypertension; diabetes; previous injuries; joint disorders; prior disorders; and steroid use.

There have been many proposals for the cause, however the most common one is repetitive microtraumas leading to failure. However, a retromalleolar hypovascular region exists in the area and may contribute to the disease. When autopsied, cadavers with the disease show decreased blood supply. The position of the tendon is also thought to contribute, as it makes a sharp turn around the medial malleolus, putting a lot of tension on the tendon. Other proposed causes include constriction underneath the flexor retinaculum, talus abnormalities, osteoarthritis, and preexisting flatfoot. Often, the onset can occur after extensive physical activity, or injury.

Symptoms

Stages 
Stage 1: Tendon is intact, but damaged.

Stage 2: Tendon has ruptured. Foot begins to deform.

Stage 3: The foot is significantly deformed. Cartilage begins to degenerate.

Stage 4: Ankle joint begins to degenerate.

In early stages, patients will describe foot and ankle pain. Swelling will also be present. Patients often have difficulty standing on their toes, difficulty walking on uneven surfaces, difficulty walking up and down stairs, and unusual or uneven wear on shoes.

In later stages, the arches collapse, the ankle rolls inwards, and the ankle joint begins to degenerate. Often toes are flared due to the valgus alignment of the foot. The patient will often lose the ability to raise their heel in the affected limb.

Diagnosis 
Imaging is the primary method of diagnosis; however, physical evaluation will often be used to determine if more testing is required. Imaging can include x-rays, MRIs, CT scans, and ultrasounds.

Differential diagnosis 
While the symptoms of PTTD are usually distinct, there are still similar conditions that should be considered.

 Tarsal coalition
 Inflammatory arthritis
 Charcot arthropathy
 Neuromuscular disease
 Traumatic disruption of midfoot ligaments

Treatment 
Treatment is dependent on the stage the disease is at, and certain factors such as the patient being elderly.

Conservative treatments 

 Prolonged rest
 Cryotherapy
 Anti-inflammatory drugs
 Walking boot/cast for up to 4 weeks
 Physical therapy
 Custom molded orthotics (if physical therapy is effective)

Surgical treatments 
If physical therapy fails, patients will often be referred for surgery.Surgery procedures become more invasive as the condition progresses.

 Tenosynovectomy with tubularization
 Medial calcaneal osteotomy with posterior tendon debridement and repair
 Flexor digitorum tendon (FDL) transfer
 Spring ligament reconstruction
 Achilles tendon lengthening
 Lateral column lengthening
 Isolated subtalar joint arthrodesis
 Medial double arthrodesis
 Triple arthrodesis common
 Deltoid ligament reconstruction
 Total ankle arthroplasty with replacement
 Tibiotalocalcaneal arthrodesis
 Valgus alignment
 Pantalar arthrodesis

Complications 
General complications include:

 Thromboembolic events
 Infection
 Wound dehiscence
 Neurologic injury
 Painful hardware

As most as of these complications stem from improper postoperative/rehabilitative care, they can general be prevented by the right care plan being put in place.

Prognosis 
Prognosis is usually good, especially if caught in early stages and patient makes sure to not overextend themselves during recovery. Once disease reaches later stages, residual damage will be unavoidable, no matter how many reconstructions are done.

References 

Musculoskeletal disorders